Nanavati Max Super Speciality Hospital formerly known as Dr. Balabhai Nanavati Hospital is a private hospital located in Vile Parle, Mumbai, India,  which was inaugurated by Jawaharlal Nehru in November 1950 and opened in May 1951. Lately, Dr. Balabhai Nanavati Hospital was taken over by Radiant Group.

History
The foundation stone at Dr. Balabhai Nanavati Hospital was laid by the Prime Minister Mr. Jawaharlal Nehru in November 1950, and the hospital opened its doors to its first patient in May 1951.

Centres of Excellence 
The hospital has the following Centres of Excellence:

 Cancer Centre
 Centre for Bone marrow Transplant
 Centre for Children's Health 
 Centre for Critical Care 
 Centre for Digestive and Liver Diseases 
 Heart Centre 
 Centre for Neurosciences 
 Centre for Orthopedics and Joint Replacement  
 Centre for Plastic and Cosmetic surgery  
 Centre for Renal Sciences & Kidney transplant
 Centre for Gastrointestinal (GI) Diseases

Location
The hospital is located on SV Road, Near LIC Colony, Suresh Colony, Vile Parle West, Mumbai, Maharashtra.

References

External links

Hospital buildings completed in 1950
Hospitals in Mumbai
Private hospitals in India
Hospitals established in 1951
1951 establishments in Bombay State
20th-century architecture in India